The Reluctant Hero (Spanish: Héroe a la fuerza) is a 1941 Spanish comedy film directed by Benito Perojo and starring Miguel Ligero, Antoñita Colomé and Alberto Romea. The film is based on a play by Sergio Pugliese. It is stylistically similar to the White Telephone films of Italy.

Cast
 Miguel Ligero 
 Antoñita Colomé
 Alberto Romea
 Manuel de Diego 
 Lily Vicenti
 Pedro Fernández Cuenca  
 Fernando Porredón
 Pedro Valdivieso
 Fernando Vallejo
 Pedro Chicote

References

Bibliography 
 Bentley, Bernard. A Companion to Spanish Cinema. Boydell & Brewer, 2008.

External links 

1941 films
Spanish comedy films
1941 comedy films
1940s Spanish-language films
Films directed by Benito Perojo
Spanish films based on plays
Spanish black-and-white films
1940s Spanish films